Sexuality in Africa varies by region.

Attitudes towards sexuality diverges between Sub-Saharan Africa and North Africa, with the former more influenced by Christianity and the latter more influenced by Islam. Discussion of sexuality in Africa often revolves around sexually transmitted diseases. Although there exist African communities that are accepting of female pleasure, others may repudiate against such an attitude, while others view sexual acts as primarily a path towards reproduction. Differences in genetic diversity show that in ancient African history, women were more likely than men to copulate and sire offspring, possibly due to female hypergamy.

References